William Alford may refer to:

 William VanMeter Alford Jr. admiral in the U.S. Navy
 William P. Alford (born 1948), U.S. legal scholar
 W. R. (Red) Alford (1937–2003), American mathematician
 Sir William Alford, Custos Rotulorum of the East Riding of Yorkshire (served 1626–aft. 1636)